Kuroki (written: 黒木 lit. "black tree") is a Japanese surname. Notable people with the surname include:

, Japanese equestrian
Ben Kuroki (1917–2015), Japanese-American United States Air Force airman
, Japanese actress
, former governor of Miyazaki Prefecture
, Japanese actress
, Japanese AV actress
, Japanese film director
, Japanese dancer and actor
, Japanese footballer
, Japanese footballer
, Japanese footballer
, Japanese actress
, Japanese football player
, Japanese actress, model and singer
, Japanese cyclist
Satoko Kuroki (born 1986), Japanese handball player
, former Nippon Professional Baseball pitcher
, Japanese general
, Japanese baseball player

Fictional characters
, a character in the manga series Wangan Midnight
, a character in the anime series Active Raid
, a character in the anime series Kengan Ashura
, the protagonist of the manga series WataMote
, a character in the manga series Nodame Cantabile
, the protagonist of the manga series Shurato
, a character in the manga series Inazuma Eleven GO

See also
Kuroki, Saskatchewan, a hamlet in Saskatchewan, Canada

Japanese-language surnames